Manpura is an upazila of Bhola District in the Division of Barisal, Bangladesh.

Geography 

It has 8,959 households and a total area of 373.19 km2. It is bounded by Tazumuddin upazila on the north, bay of bengal on the south, Hatiya upazila on the east, Lalmohan and Char Fasson upazilas on the west.

Demographics 
According to the 2001 Bangladesh census, Manpura had a population of 67,304. Males constituted 51.63% of the population, and females 48.37%. The population aged 18 or over was 20,940. Manpura had an average literacy rate of 21.3% (7+ years), compared to the national average of 50.4%+.

Administration 
Manpura was formed as a Thana on 25 December 1970 and it was turned into an upazila on 7 November 1983.

Manpura Upazila is divided into four union parishads: Dakshin Sakuchia, Hazirhat, Monpura, and Uttar Sakuchia. The union parishads are subdivided into 18 mauzas and 30 villages.

Education
 Monpura Degree College
 Monoyara Begum mohila college
 Abdullah al Islam Jakob College
 Monpura Girls' Secondary School
 Hazir Hat Girls School

See also 
Upazilas of Bangladesh
Districts of Bangladesh
Divisions of Bangladesh

References 

Upazilas of Bhola District